(쫄면) is either a type of Korean noodle with a very chewy texture made from wheat flour and starch, or a cold and spicy dish  made with the noodles and vegetables.  can add many vegetables such as cabbage and bean sprouts.

The chewy texture of jjolmyeon noodles owes to its manufacturing process in which the dough is heated to 130-150 degrees Celsius and extruded by a machine under high pressure, in a manner similar to rice cake production.

Etymology 
The first syllable of the name comes from the sound symbolism  in Korean, which means "chewy", while  is a hanja word meaning "noodles". Thus, the name literally means "chewy noodles".

History 
It is a representative dish of Incheon, where  originated in the early 1970s by a mistake made while making . Noodles larger than regular  noodles were made at a factory and instead of being thrown out, were given away to a nearby .

See also 
 Korean noodles

References

External links 

 Jjolymyeon recipe
  Jjolmyeon recipe at Naver Kitchen

Korean noodles
South Korean noodle dishes
Mixed noodles
Cold noodles